John Boyd (10 September 1926 – May 2007) was an American soccer player who played for English clubs Gloucester City, Bristol City and Bath City, as a right winger.

References

1926 births
2007 deaths
American soccer players
Gloucester City A.F.C. players
Bristol City F.C. players
Bath City F.C. players
English Football League players
Association football wingers
American expatriate soccer players
American expatriates in England
Expatriate footballers in England